Totopara  is a village in the Madarihat-Birpara CD block in the Alipurduar subdivision of the Alipurduar district of West Bengal, India.

Geography

Location

Administratively, this village falls under the Madarihat police station. It is bounded by the foothills of Bhutan to the north, Torsa River to the east, and Hauri river and the Titi reserve forest on the south-west separated by the Hauri river. The nearest village is Ballalguri, which is about 5 km to the south of Totopara. There is a single lane motorable road leading to this village from the National Highway 31 through Hantapara. The area of the village is about 8.08 km2. The village is about 22 km from Madarihat, which is the entry point of the famous Jaldapara National Park.

Area overview
Alipurduar district is covered by two maps. It is an extensive area in the eastern end of the Dooars in West Bengal. It is undulating country, largely forested, with numerous rivers flowing down from the outer ranges of the Himalayas in Bhutan. It is a predominantly rural area with 79.38% of the population living in the rural areas. The district has 1 municipal town and 20 census towns and that means that 20.62% of the population lives in urban areas. The scheduled castes and scheduled tribes, taken together, form more than half the population in all the six community development blocks in the district. There is a high concentration of tribal people (scheduled tribes) in the three northern blocks of the district.

Note: The map alongside presents some of the notable locations in the subdivision. All places marked in the map are linked in the larger full screen map.

Demographics
As per the 2011 Census of India, Totopara had a total population of 2,960.  There were 1,568 (53%) males and 1,392 (47%) females. There were 400 persons in the age range of 0 to 6 years. The total number of literate people in Totopara was 1,486 (58.05% of the population over 6 years).

Education
In 1990 a primary school was opened to cater to the children of the village and since 1995, a high school with hostel facility was also opened. There is one primary health centre in the village.

Culture
This village is home to the unique Toto tribe that have a clearly distinguished culture and language from the neighboring peoples of the region.

References

External links 
 People of Dooars
Totopara Village
 Missionary impact on the Toto tribals

Villages in Alipurduar district